Amoria turneri, common name Turner's volute, is a species of sea snail, a marine gastropod mollusk in the family Volutidae, the volutes.

The following subspecies have been brought into synonymy:
 Amoria turneri broderipi Gray, 1864 accepted as Amoria turneri (Gray in Griffith & Pidgeon, 1834)
 Amoria turneri cumingi Gray, 1864 accepted as Amoria praetexta (Reeve, 1849)
 Amoria turneri damonii Gray, 1864 accepted as Amoria damonii Gray, 1864
 Amoria turneri jamrachi Gray, 1864 accepted as Amoria jamrachi Gray, 1864

Description
The length of the shell varies between 40 mm and 80 mm.

Distribution
This marine species occurs off North Australia and Northwest Australia.; in the Arafura Sea and off New Guinea.

References

 Bail, P & Poppe, G. T. 2001. A conchological iconography: a taxonomic introduction of the recent Volutidae. Hackenheim-Conchbook, 30 pp, 5 pl.
 Bail P. & Limpus A. (2001) The genus Amoria. In: G.T. Poppe & K. Groh (eds) A conchological iconography. Hackenheim: Conchbooks. 50 pp., 93 pls.

External links
 

Volutidae
Gastropods described in 1834